Sanna Grønlid (born 2 May 1959) is a former Norwegian biathlete, world champion and world cup winner.

World championships
She received a gold medal in the 5 km sprint at the 1985 Biathlon World Championships in Egg am Etzel, and a gold medal in the 10 km individual at the 1987 Biathlon World Championships 1987 in Lahti. She participated in the Norwegian team that won silver and bronze medals in the 3 × 5 km relay in 1984, 1985, 1986 and 1987.

World cup
Grønlid won the overall Biathlon World Cup in the 1984/85 season. She finished 2nd in 1983/84 and 1985/86, and 3rd in 1986/87.

References

1959 births
Norwegian female biathletes
Living people
Biathlon World Championships medalists
20th-century Norwegian women